Jessy Serrata (November 2, 1953 – August 4, 2017), nicknamed "Mr. Iron Throat", was an American Tejano musician and vocalist. Jessy was born in Knox City, Texas, to Matias and Agapita Serrata. He appeared on over 17 albums. His daughter, Brandy Bee Serrata, is also a vocalist.

Although he was best known for his voice, Jessy also played bass guitar. His music career began with Agapito Zuniga (a.k.a. El Rey de la Cumbia). In 1972, he became a member of the group Los Buenos which included his brother Rene Serrata; the brothers would also perform as Los Hermanos Serrata. Jessy was half of the duo Los Chachos with Cha Cha Jimenez.

Jessy's trademark phrase was "Awww Baby", often uttered to express his enthusiasm while performing his music. He tours throughout the US with his band, The New Wave Band. His album Better Than Ever was nominated for a Latin Grammy in 2004.

Recorded and performed with:
Steve Jordan
Oscar Hernandez y Los Professionales
Conjunto Bernal
Bobby Naranjo y Grupo Dirreccion
Tuff Band

Discography
Conoscan Los Buenos
Steve Jordan albums
Camella
La Petra
Mi Unico Carino (as part of Tuff Band) - 1984
La Tejanita - 1992 
La Tejanita Two - 1998 
Better Than Ever - 2004

Hits he has composed
"La Quiero"
"Vuelve"
"La Tejanita Mujer"
"Santa Loco"
"El Potpourri" (with Conjunto Bernal) - includes "Desde Ayer", the Beatles hit "Yesterday" translated into Spanish

External links
Official website

1953 births
2017 deaths
American male singers
American musicians of Mexican descent
Tejano musicians
Musicians from Texas
People from Knox City, Texas